Terror Syndrome is the debut album by Canadian metal band Terror Syndrome. The album was independently released in July 2008 through online distributors. A physical release, with a new track featuring the band's new vocalist Dave Padden, is planned for 2009.

Background
Canadian drummer Ryan Van Poederooyen, known for his work in experimental metal band God Awakens Petrified and progressive metal group The Devin Townsend Band, first announced plans for a solo project in mid-2004. Over time, his idea grew from a solo project to a complete band. In late 2006, the band's name and lineup were announced. Terror Syndrome's initial lineup consisted of Van Poederooyen alongside God Awakens Petrified vocalist Denton Bramley and Devin Townsend Band members Mike Young and Dave Young.

The band's first album, with music primarily written by Van Poederooyen and lyrics by Van Poederooyen and Bramley, was recorded throughout 2006 and 2007, with a number of guest musicians including Michael Manring, Alex Skolnick, and Devin Townsend.

Release
Terror Syndrome was independently released July 10, 2008 as a digital download. Shortly after the album's release, Bramley departed and was replaced by Annihilator vocalist Dave Padden. A physical release of Terror Syndrome, with a new track featuring Padden, is planned for 2009.

Track listing
All music written by Ryan Van Poederooyen (RVP) except where noted.

Personnel

Terror Syndrome
 Denton Bramley – vocals
 Ryan Van Poederooyen – drums
 Dave Young – guitar
 Mike Young – bass

Guest musicians
 Trevor Dunn – bass (track 8)
 Christofer Malmström – guitar (track 5)
 Michael Manring – bass (track 12)
 Alex Skolnick – guitar (track 8)
 Byron Stroud – bass (track 11)
 Devin Townsend – guitar (track 12)

Production
 Ryan Van Poederooyen – production
 Shaun Thingvold – engineering, editing
 Dave Young – engineering
 Mike Young – engineering, editing
 Devin Townsend – engineering, mixing
 Greg Reely – mastering
 Rob Stefanson – engineering assistance
 Bryan Coisne – engineering assistance
 Jay Van Poederooyen – editing

Design
 Jos Van Poederooyen – photography

References

2008 debut albums
Terror Syndrome albums